Mikhail Youzhny was the defending champion, but withdrew due to a viral infection.
Viktor Troicki won this tournament. He defeated 4th seed Marcos Baghdatis 3–6, 6–4, 6–3 in the final.

Seeds
The top four seeds received a bye into the second round.

Draw

Finals

Top half

Bottom half

References
 Main Draw
 Qualifying Draw

Kremlin Cup - Men's Singles
Kremlin Cup